Émile Schneider may refer to:

 Émile Schneider (painter) (1873–1947), French-Alsatian painter and art teacher
 Émile Schneider (actor) (born 1989), Canadian film and television actor